In Buddhism, Jāti (Sanskrit/Pāli), "birth", refers to physical birth; to rebirth, the arising of a new living entity within saṃsāra (cyclic existence); and to the arising of mental phenomena.

Meaning
Within the teachings on the Four Noble Truths, jāti refers to physical birth, and is qualified  as dukkha (suffering): "Now this, monks, is the noble truth of dukkha: birth (jati) is dukkha, aging is dukkha, death is dukkha."

In traditional Buddhist thought, there are four forms of birth:
 birth from an egg (Sanskrit: Andaja; Pali: Aṇḍaja;)—like a bird, fish, or reptile;
 birth from a womb (Sanskrit: Jarayuja; Pali: Jalābuja;)—like most mammals and some worldly devas;
 birth from moisture (Sanskrit: Samsvedaja; Pali: Saṃsedaja;)—probably referring to the appearance of animals whose eggs are microscopic, like maggots appearing in rotting flesh;
 birth by transformation (Sanskrit: Upapaduka; Pali: Opapatika;)—miraculous materialization, as with this devas.

Jāti is the eleventh link within the eleventh Nidāna of paṭiccasamuppāda ("dependent arising" or "dependent origination"), where it can refer both to rebirth and to the arising of mental phenomena. The Vibhanga, the second book of the Theravada Abbidhamma, treats it in both ways. In the Suttantabhajaniya it is described as rebirth, which is conditioned by becoming (bhava), and gives rise to old age and death in a living being. In the Abhidhammabhajaniya it is treated as the arising of mental phenomena.

References

Sources

Further reading
Single suttas
 Piyadassi Thera (trans.) (1999). Dhammacakkappavattana Sutta: Setting in Motion the Wheel of Truth (SN 56.11). Retrieved 2007-06-13 from "Access to Insight" at Dhammacakkappavattana Sutta: Setting in Motion the Wheel of Truth.
 Thanissaro Bhikkhu (trans.) (1997). Paticca-samuppada-vibhanga Sutta: Analysis of Dependent Co-arising (SN 12.2). Retrieved 2007-06-20 from "Access to Insight" at SN XII.2: Paticca-samuppada-vibhanga Sutta.
 Thanissaro Bhikkhu (trans.) (2000). Maha-satipatthana Sutta: The Great Frames of Reference (DN 22). Retrieved 2007-06-20 from "Access to Insight" at Maha-satipatthana Sutta: The Great Frames of Reference.
 

Sutta-collections
 
 

Commentaries and interpretations
 
 
 
 
 
 
 
 
 
 

Scholarly
 
 
 

Twelve nidānas
Sanskrit words and phrases